Snoilsky was the name of three Swedish noble families, who are all now extinct. The family originated from Slovenia.

A famous member of this family is the poet Carl Snoilsky and his mother, painter Sigrid Snoilsky (née Banér).

References 

Swedish noble families
Swedish people of Slovenian descent
Swedish people of Austrian descent
Swedish people of Hungarian descent